Victor D. Cha (born 1960) is an American academic, author and former national foreign policy advisor.

He is a former Director for Asian Affairs in the White House's National Security Council, with responsibility for Japan, North and South Korea, Australia, and New Zealand. He was George W. Bush's top advisor on North Korean affairs. He currently holds the D. S. Song-Korea Foundation Chair in Asian Studies and is the Director of the Asian Studies program in the Edmund A. Walsh School of Foreign Service at Georgetown University. Cha is also senior advisor at the Center for Strategic and International Studies (CSIS).

Personal life
Cha's father came to U.S. from South Korea to study at Columbia University in 1954. Cha was born in the early 1960s in the United States.

Cha lives in Maryland with his wife and two sons.

Education

Cha received a BA in economics from Columbia University in 1983, an MA in philosophy, politics, and economics from Hertford College, Oxford, in 1986, an MIA from Columbia, and a PhD in political science from Columbia in 1994 with thesis titled Alignment despite antagonism: Japan and Korea as quasi-allies.

Career

Cha is a former John M. Olin National Security Fellow at Harvard University, two-time Fulbright Scholar, and Hoover National Fellow and Center for International Security and Cooperation (CISAC) Fellow at Stanford University.

Before entering government, he served as an independent consultant, testified before Congress on Asian security issues, and was a guest analyst for various media including CNN, ABC News's Nightline, Newshour with Jim Lehrer, CBS News, Fox News, BBC News, National Public Radio, The New York Times, The Washington Post and Time. He served on the editorial boards of several academic journals and wrote columns for CSIS Comparative Connections; Korea JoongAng Daily; Chosun Ilbo, and Japan Times.

He held the D. S. Song-Korea Foundation Chair in Asian Studies and Government in the Edmund Walsh School of Foreign Service and directed the American Alliances in Asia Project at Georgetown University until 2004.

In December 2004, Cha joined the National Security Council as Director for Asian Affairs. At the NSC, he was responsible for South Korea, North Korea, Japan, Australia, New Zealand, and the Pacific Island nations. He also served as the U.S. Deputy Head of Delegation for the Six Party Talks. Cha received two Outstanding Service commendations during his tenure at the White House.

Cha returned to Georgetown in late 2007 after public service leave. Currently, he is the inaugural holder of the D.S. Song-Korea Foundation Chair in Asian studies and a joint appointment with the School of Foreign Service core faculty and the Department of Government and is the Director of the Asian Studies program. He is also a senior adviser at the CSIS on Asian affairs.

It was reported in January 2018 that the Trump administration expected to withdraw his nomination for U.S. Ambassador to South Korea. Cha had reportedly in December 2017 privately expressed disagreement with the Trump administration's consideration to launch a limited strike at North Korea and to withdraw from the United States–Korea Free Trade Agreement. Cha later praised the summit meetings between Donald Trump and Kim Jong-un for peacefully resolving the 2017–2018 North Korea crisis, calling the 2018 North Korea–United States Singapore Summit "the start of a diplomatic process that takes us away from the brink of war."

In 2020, Cha, along with over 130 other former Republican national security officials, signed a statement that asserted that President Trump was unfit to serve another term, and "To that end, we are firmly convinced that it is in the best interest of our nation that Vice President Joe Biden be elected as the next President of the United States, and we will vote for him."

Publications

Cha is the author of numerous articles, books, and other works on Asian security.

He authored Alignment Despite Antagonism: The US-Korea-Japan Security Triangle (1999), which received the 2000 Ohira Book Prize. The book presented a new, alternative theory regarding Japan and South Korea's political alignment despite their historical animosity. Cha wrote this in response to previous research on the subject, which he felt focused too heavily on their respective historical antagonism.

In 2005, Cha co-authored Nuclear North Korea: A Debate on Engagement Strategies with Professor David Kang of Dartmouth College and its Tuck School of Business. The co-authors presented their respective viewpoints on the best way to handle the Korean conflict, with Cha presenting a more "hawkish" approach and Kang presenting his more "dovish" arguments. 

Cha's published Beyond the Final Score: The Politics of Sport in Asia in 2009. In 2012 he published a timely book on North Korea in the wake of Kim Jong-Il's death, The Impossible State: North Korea, Past and Future. Cha's most recent book on East Asian security was published in 2016, Powerplay: The Origins of the American Alliance System in Asia.

He has published articles on international relations and East Asia in International Security, Foreign Affairs, Survival, Political Science Quarterly, International Studies Quarterly, Orbis, Armed Forces and Society, Journal of Peace Research, Security Dialogue, Australian Journal of International Affairs, Asian Survey, Journal of East Asian Studies, Asian Perspective, the Japanese Journal of Political Science and The Washington Post. 

Recent publications include "Winning Asia: An Untold American Foreign Policy Success" in the November/December 2007 issue of Foreign Affairs; "Beijing's Olympic-Sized Catch 22" in the Summer 2008 issue of the Washington Quarterly; and "Powerplay Origins of the U.S. Alliance System in Asia" in the Winter 2009/10 issue of International Security.

Books
 The Geneva Framework Agreement and Korea's future, East Asian Institute, Columbia University, 1995
 Alignment Despite Antagonism: The United States-Korea-Japan Security Triangle, Stanford University Press, 2000
 Nuclear North Korea: A Debate on Engagement Strategies, Columbia University Press, 2005
 Beyond the Final Score: The Politics of Sport in Asia, Columbia University Press, 2008
 The Impossible State: North Korea, Past and Future, Ecco/HarperCollins, 2012
 Powerplay: The Origins of the American Alliance System in Asia, Princeton University Press, 2016

Articles
 Complex Patchworks: U.S. Alliances as Part of Asia's Regional Architecture (Asia Policy, January 2011)
 Korea: A Peninsula in Crisis and Flux in Strategic Asia 2004–05: Confronting Terrorism in the Pursuit of Power (National Bureau of Asian Research, 2004)
 South Korea: Anchored or Adrift? in Strategic Asia 2003–04: Fragility and Crisis (National Bureau of Asian Research, 2003)
 Defensive Realism and Japan's Approach toward Korean Reunification (NBR Analysis, 2003)

Powerplay (theory)

"Powerplay" is a term coined by Cha in his article "Powerplay Origins of the U.S. Alliance System in Asia" to explain the reason behind the United States’ decision to pursue a series of bilateral alliances with East Asian countries such as Republic of Korea, the Republic of China, and Japan instead of multilateral alliances like NATO with European countries under liberal institutionalism. To illustrate a country's preference when forming an alliance structure, Cha incorporates a figure of different possible quadrants dependent on power asymmetry between allies and the types of control one seeks over the target state.  

Defined as "the construction of an asymmetric alliance designed to exert maximum control over the smaller ally's actions," powerplay mainly describes the relations between the U.S. and Taiwan, South Korea, and Japan like that of the hub and spokes system which aimed to contain the Soviet threat, but the primary rationale was to constrain potential "rogue allies"—that is, "rabidly anticommunist dictators who might start wars for reasons of domestic legitimacy that the United States wanted no part of as it was gearing up for a protracted global struggle against the Soviet Union."

Although "[a]s a rule, multilateralism is the preferred strategy for exercising control over another country," bilateralism was preferred in the region and was thus deliberately selected due to the asymmetric advantages of creating economic and material dependency of the smaller states on the stronger state by constraining aggressive behaviors of the former. In the post-Cold War period, the domino theory, which “held that the fall of one small country in Asia could trigger a chain of countries falling to communism” was prevailing, which made the U.S. perceive the costs of pursuing multilateralism high as it may entrap the U.S. into another unwanted war.

The presence of "rogue allies" was one of the costs involved in engaging in such a strategy, as they had the potential to use aggressive behavior unilaterally that could have involved the U.S. in more military conflicts. The "rogue allies" that the U.S. leaders were worried about include Taiwan's Chiang Kai-shek, who was planning to take back mainland China, and South Korea's Syngman Rhee, who wanted to unify the Korean Peninsula, and they were also worried that Japan was recovering its regional power in Asia. With a thorough investigation of several empirical case studies of Taiwan, South Korea, and Japan during the Truman and Eisenhower administrations, Cha concludes that the postwar U.S. planners had selected this type of security architecture because it offers the safest architecture to prevent aggression by East Asia's pro-West dictators and increases leverage and the states' dependency on the U.S. economy. The word “powerplay” is commonly used in any political or social situation when one uses its knowledge or information against another to gain benefit based on one's situational advantages.

References

External links
 

Living people
Walsh School of Foreign Service faculty
Columbia College (New York) alumni
School of International and Public Affairs, Columbia University alumni
Columbia Graduate School of Arts and Sciences alumni
Alumni of Hertford College, Oxford
American writers of Korean descent
Experts on North Korea
United States National Security Council staffers
United States presidential advisors
George W. Bush administration personnel
1960s births
American politicians of Korean descent
CSIS people
Asian conservatism in the United States